MTK Hungária FC women's football team represents MTK Hungária FC in Noi NB I (Jet-Sol Liga), Hungary's premier women's league.

Honours
 Hungarian Women's League: 7 (2005, 2010, 2011, 2012, 2013, 2014, 2017)
 Hungarian Women's Cup: 4 (2005, 2010, 2013, 2014)

UEFA Competitions record

Current squad
As of 29 Dec 2022

Former players 
  Henrietta Csiszár, Fanny Vágó, Anita Pádár, Zsanett Jakabfi, Zsanett Kaján

References

External links
 Profile in UEFA.com

MTK Budapest FC
Football clubs in Budapest
Women's football clubs in Hungary
Association football clubs established in 2002
2002 establishments in Hungary